Karl Martin Ingemar Almgren, (born 19 December 1987) is a Swedish singer and winner of Idol 2015 which was broadcast on TV4.

Almgren was born in Lindesberg. He released his debut single Can't Hold Me Down after winning the Globen finale.

He competed in Melodifestivalen 2018 with the song "A Bitter Lullaby", finishing in eighth place in the grand final.

Discography

Studio albums

Extended plays

Singles

References

Living people
1987 births
Idol (Swedish TV series) winners
21st-century Swedish singers
21st-century Swedish male singers
Idol (Swedish TV series) participants
Melodifestivalen contestants of 2018